The 2022–23 Combined Counties Football League season (known as the 2022–23 Cherry Red Records Combined Counties Football League for sponsorship reasons) is the 45th in the history of the Combined Counties Football League, a football competition in England. Teams were divided into three divisions; the Premier North, the Premier South and the First.

The constitution was announced on 12 May 2022.

Premier Division North
Premier Division North consists of 20 clubs, increased from 18 last season, after Hanworth Villa and Southall were promoted to the Isthmian League South Central Division; Abbey Rangers and Tadley Calleva were transferred to Premier Division South; St Panteleimon were transferred to the Spartan South Midlands League Premier Division, and CB Hounslow United were relegated to Division One. Eight new clubs joined the division:
Four transferred from the Spartan South Midlands League Premier Division:
Broadfields United
Flackwell Heath
Harefield United
Oxhey Jets
Three promoted from Division One:
London Lions
Hilltop, promoted in July 2022 after the withdrawal of Staines Town
Wallingford & Crowmarsh, who changed their name from Wallingford Town
One relegated from the Isthmian League South Central Division:
Chalfont St Peter
One other club renamed:
Edgware Town to Edgware & Kingsbury

Staines Town were initially relegated from the Isthmian League South Central Division, but suspended operations, withdrew from the league, and in July 2022 were replaced by Hilltop.

League table
<onlyinclude>

Premier Division South
Premier Division South remains at 20 clubs after Beckenham Town were promoted to the Isthmian League South East Division, Walton & Hersham were promoted to the Isthmian League South Central Division, and Molesey were relegated to Division One. Three new clubs joined the division:
One transferred from the Wessex League Premier Division:
Alton
Two transferred from Premier Division North:
Abbey Rangers
Tadley Calleva

League table
<onlyinclude>

Division One
Division One remained at 21 clubs after London Lions, Hilltop and Wallingford Town were promoted to the Premier Division North; Enfield Borough were transferred to the Eastern Counties League Division One South, and Chalvey Sports were relegated. Five new clubs joined the division:
One relegated from Premier Division North:
CB Hounslow United
One relegated from Premier Division South:
Molesey
One promoted from the Surrey Premier County League:
Spartans Youth
One transferred from the Southern Counties East League Division One:
Westside
One transferred from the Spartan South Midlands League Division One:
Penn & Tylers Green

A.F.C. Hayes reverted to their previous name of Brook House F.C.
Bedfont & Feltham changed their name to Bedfont F.C.
Kensington & Ealing Borough changed their name to Rising Ballers Kensington F.C.

Initially, Holmer Green were transferred from the Spartan South Midlands League Premier Division, but this was later reversed.

League table
<onlyinclude>

References

External links
 Combined Counties League Official Site

2022-23
9